Ghosty is an American rock band.

Ghosty may also refer to:

 Ghosty (producer), a British DJ and record producer

See also
 Ghost (disambiguation)
 Ghostly (disambiguation)